Frank Leslie's Illustrated Newspaper, later renamed Leslie's Weekly, was an American illustrated literary and news magazine founded in 1855 and published until 1922. It was one of several magazines started by publisher and illustrator Frank Leslie.

Throughout its existence, the weekly provided illustrations and reports—first with wood engravings and daguerreotypes, later with more advanced forms of photography—of wars from John Brown's raid at Harpers Ferry and the Civil War until the Spanish–American War and the First World War.

Surviving issues today are highly prized as collectors' items for vividly depicting American life during the seven decades of its existence. Many distinguished writers were featured in its pages.

History

Background
Frank Leslie was the pen name of Henry Carter (1821–1880), the son of a well-to-do English glovemaker. Carter had taken up the art of wood engraving over his father's objection and emigrated to New York City to make his own way in the world, arriving in 1848. Carter — who adopted the Frank Leslie name immediately upon his arrival — was unable to find a position as an illustrator with an established newspaper in the city and was forced to open his own business, a small engraving shop on Broadway.

One of Leslie's early clients was promoter P. T. Barnum, who commissioned Leslie to produce a posh illustrated concert program for singer Jenny Lind in 1849. Additional work was done for Barnum for another Lind tour in 1850 and 1851. When Barnum decided to launch a publication called The Illustrated News in 1853, he turned to Leslie, hiring him as chief engraver for the short-lived publication, which failed within its first year of existence.

Out of a job once more, Leslie decided to begin publishing on his own, launching two new periodicals in 1854 — Frank Leslie's Ladies' Gazette of Fashion, a fashion-oriented newspaper, and Frank Leslie's Journal of Romance, an illustrated fiction magazine. Both of these publications proved to be financially lucrative, and in 1855, Leslie added a third publication to his stable, an illustrated news weekly called Frank Leslie's Illustrated Newspaper.

Early years

The first years of Frank Leslie's Illustrated Newspaper were difficult, with the nation undergoing a business crisis in 1857. The drama of the massive American Civil War in 1861, though,  ensured the success of Leslie's Newspaper, as tens of thousands of readers turned to Leslie and the upstart Harper's Weekly for their sometimes lurid illustrations of the bloody conflict. A "Leslie's" freelancer, James R. O'Neill, is believed to have been the only Civil War correspondent killed in action in the Civil War.

No daily newspaper in America consistently carried illustrations until the launch of the New York Daily Graphic in 1873, by which time Leslie's Newspaper was a massive and prosperous concern, employing more than 300 people, including 70 illustrators, as part of a publishing empire which by now spanned seven publications.

Production process

Leslie's Newspaper averaged 16 pages and was frequently accompanied by supplements or expanded into special thematic editions. Content strived to be timely, focusing on the newsworthy events of the previous week, often within days of its occurrence, a novelty for the era. Art was produced by teams, with initial sketches selected by an editor and turned over to an illustrator, who produced an outline drawing. The outline was then applied to a block consisting of multiple layers of Turkish boxwood and additional detail added by specialized artists.

The large block of wood was then separated into its constituent pieces and turned over to the engraving department, which meticulously carved out the white sections, leaving the black illustration in relief. The sections of the wood block were then rejoined and sent to the composing room, where the illustration was converted to part of an electrotyped copper plate for printing.

Years after Frank Leslie's death
After Leslie's death in 1880, the magazine was continued by his widow,  women's suffrage campaigner Miriam Florence Leslie. The name, by then a well-established trademark, remained also after 1902, when it no longer had a connection with the Leslie family. It continued as a weekly until 1922 but switched to a monthly publication in 1921.

It often took a strongly patriotic stance and frequently featured cover pictures of soldiers and heroic battle stories. It also gave extensive coverage to less martial events such as the Klondike gold rush of 1897, covered by San Francisco journalist John Bonner.

Among the writers publishing their stories in the weekly were Louisa May Alcott, H. Irving Hancock, Helen R. Martin, Eleanor Franklin Egan, and Ellis Parker Butler. Several notable illustrators worked for the publication, including Albert Berghaus and Norman Rockwell, who created covers for the magazine in its latter years, Emmett Watson, and Fernando Miranda y Casellas. James Montgomery Flagg's iconic depiction of Uncle Sam first appeared publicly on the cover of the July 6, 1916 issue, with the caption "What Are You Doing for Preparedness?", before becoming a famed recruiting poster on American entry into World War I.

By 1897, the publication's circulation had grown to an estimated 65,000 copies.

Surviving copies of the magazine at present fetch handsome prices as collectors' items and are considered to give a vivid picture of American life during the decades of its publication.

See also
 Cathedral of All Saints (Albany, New York)

Gallery

References

Further reading
 Joshua Brown, "The Great Uprising and Pictorial Order in Gilded Age America," in David O. Stowell (ed.), The Great Strikes of 1877. Urbana, IL: University of Illinois Press, 2008; pp. 15–54.

External links

 1890 volume of paper, via Google books
1917-1918 issues covering the Great War, via Digital Library@Villanova University
 Coverage of the laying of the 1858 Atlantic Cable in Frank Leslie's Illustrated Newspaper
 "At the Gate of Klondike" by John Bonner in Frank Leslie's Illustrated Newspaper, 1858 
 Sketch depicting Oscar Wilde from Leslie's Weekly
 The San Francisco Earthquake in Leslie's Weekly
 Leslie's Weekly, Volume 133, Issue 3451. From Google books.
 Accessible Archives has complete set (institutional subscription required)

 https://archive.org/details/pub_leslies-weekly

1855 establishments in the United States
1922 disestablishments in the United States
Defunct literary magazines published in the United States
Magazines established in 1855
Magazines disestablished in 1922
News magazines published in the United States
Weekly magazines published in the United States